Govett is a surname, and may refer to:

 Francis Algernon Govett (1858–1926), British stockbroker and company director 
 James William Govett (1910–1998), Australian impressionist painter
 John Govett, 19th-century politician in Queensland, Australia
 Jonathan Govett (born 1969), English cricketer
 Robert Govett (1813–1901), British theologian and independent minister
 William Romaine Govett (1807–1848), painter and surveyor in New South Wales